Lars Olsson may refer to:

 Lars Olsson (cross-country skier), Swedish former cross-country skier
 Lars Olsson (alpine skier) (born 1944), Swedish former alpine skier
 Lars Olsson (swimmer) from Swimming at the 1980 Summer Paralympics
 Lars Olsson (bandy) (born 1947), Swedish bandy player

See also
Lars Olsen (disambiguation)